Mormolycina obertheuri is a species of beetle in the family Carabidae, the only species in the genus Mormolycina.

References

Lebiinae